Leon Thomas Griffin (born ) is a British male former weightlifter, competing in the 85 kg category and representing Great Britain and England at international competitions.

Weightlifting career
Griffin competed at world championships, most recently at the 1999 World Weightlifting Championships.

He represented England in the 70 kg category, at the 1994 Commonwealth Games in Victoria, Canada. Four years later he represented the England team again and won three medals after stepping up in weight to 85 kg, at the 1998 Commonwealth Games in Kuala Lumpur, Malaysia.

Major results

See also
British records in Olympic weightlifting

References

Further reading
 Peterborough Today 
 Commonwealth Games Medalists - Weightlifting
 Independent.co.uk
 Leon Griffin Wins Ironman 70.3 Timberman
 Kuala Lumpur 1998: Silver Medallists
 1998 Men under 85kg
 2003 London Open Championships

1975 births
Living people
British male weightlifters
Place of birth missing (living people)
English male weightlifters
Weightlifters at the 1994 Commonwealth Games
Weightlifters at the 1998 Commonwealth Games
Commonwealth Games medallists in weightlifting
Commonwealth Games gold medallists for England
Commonwealth Games silver medallists for England
Medallists at the 1998 Commonwealth Games